The jamoats of Tajikistan ("village communes") are the third-level administrative divisions, similar to communes or municipalities, in the Central Asian country of Tajikistan. As of January 2020, there are 368 rural jamoats, 65 towns and 18 cities in Tajikistan. Each jamoat is further subdivided into villages (or deha or qyshqol)

The jamoats and towns, and their population figures (as of January 2015) by district of each region are listed below:

Sughd Region

Districts of Republican Subordination

Khatlon Region

Gorno-Badakhshan Autonomous Region

References

External links
List of Jamoats

 
Subdivisions of Tajikistan
Tajikistan 3
Tajikistan 3
Municipalities, Tajikistan